Methade, or 6-(dimethylamino)-4,4-diphenylheptane, is the parent compound of the methadone and methadol series of opioid analgesics:

Chemical derivatives
The methade series includes the following compounds:

 Acetylmethadol
 Alphacetylmethadol
 Levacetylmethadol
 Betacetylmethadol)
 Dimepheptanol (or methadol)
 Alphamethadol
 Betamethadol
 Methadone
 Levomethadone
 Noracymethadol
 Normethadone

Related compounds
Some related compounds include:

 Alimadol
 Dextromoramide
 Dextropropoxyphene
 Dipipanone
 Isomethadone
 Normethadone
 Norpipanone
 Phenadoxone

References

Dimethylamino compounds
Phenyl compounds